Cristian Ariel Bordacahar (born 27 October 1991) is an Argentine professional footballer who plays as a forward for FBC Melgar.

Career
Bordacahar started his career with Juventud de Olavarría, before joining Tigre. His first appearances for the club came in the 2011–12 Copa Argentina, with the forward featuring in ties with Gimnasia y Esgrima and Deportivo Merlo. Ahead of January 2013, Bordacahar agreed to join Primera B Metropolitana's Brown on loan. He scored twice in his first three appearances, netting against Central Córdoba and Atlanta. Three further goals followed across a total of twenty-three appearances. Bordacahar returned to Tigre for the 2013–14 Argentine Primera División season, subsequently featuring twenty times for them whilst scoring once.

Bordacahar joined Chacarita Juniors on 12 August 2014. After spending three seasons with Chacarita, two of which in Primera B Nacional after they won promotion in 2014, Bordacahar completed a move to Los Andes which occurred in 2016. A year later saw Bordacahar rejoin former loan team Brown, now plying their trade in the second tier. He scored four goals in his second spell with the club, including one in November 2017 against Ferro Carril Oeste who then signed Bordacahar on 30 June 2018. He made his debut during a defeat to Neuva Chicago in August.

Career statistics
.

References

External links

1991 births
Living people
Sportspeople from Buenos Aires Province
Argentine footballers
Association football forwards
Primera B Metropolitana players
Argentine Primera División players
Primera Nacional players
Club Atlético Tigre footballers
Club Atlético Brown footballers
Chacarita Juniors footballers
Club Atlético Los Andes footballers
Ferro Carril Oeste footballers
FBC Melgar footballers